Isidoro Martínez-Vela (17 January 1925 – 18 July 2012) was a Spanish freestyle swimmer. He competed in three events at the 1948 Summer Olympics.

References

External links
 

1925 births
2012 deaths
Spanish male freestyle swimmers
Olympic swimmers of Spain
Swimmers at the 1948 Summer Olympics
Swimmers from Barcelona